is a Japanese retired football player.

Club statistics
Updated to 2 January 2020.

References

External links
Profile at Kagoshima United FC

1985 births
Living people
University of Tsukuba alumni
Association football people from Tokyo
Japanese footballers
J2 League players
J3 League players
Japan Football League players
FC Gifu players
Kagoshima United FC players
Association football defenders